Let Me Be Your Woman is the third studio album recorded by American singer Linda Clifford, released in 1979 on the RSO/Curtom label.

Chart performance
The album peaked at No. 19 on the R&B albums chart. It also reached No. 26 on the Billboard 200. The album features a disco-styled cover version of "Bridge over Troubled Water", which peaked at No. 49 on the Hot Soul Singles chart and No. 41 on the Billboard Hot 100. A second single, "Don't Give It Up", also charted at No. 15 on the Hot Soul Singles chart. In addition, all the cuts of the  album peaked at No. 11 on the Hot Dance/Disco chart.

Track listing

Charts

Singles

References

External links
 

1979 albums
Linda Clifford albums
Albums produced by Gil Askey
RSO Records albums
Curtom Records albums